During the Parade of Nations portion of the 1988 Summer Olympics opening ceremony, athletes from each country participating in the Olympics paraded in the arena, preceded by their flag. The flag was borne by a sportsperson from that country chosen either by the National Olympic Committee or by the athletes themselves to represent their country.

Parade order
As the nation of the first modern Olympic Games, Greece entered the stadium first; whereas, the host nation South Korea marched last. Other countries entered in alphabetical order in the language of the host country (Korean), according with tradition and IOC guidelines. The collation method used is based on the names as written in Hangul, a traditional Korean alphabet.

Whilst most countries entered under their short names, a few entered under more formal or alternative names, mostly due to political and naming disputes. The Republic of China (commonly known as Taiwan) entered with the compromised name and flag of "Chinese Taipei" ("차이니스 타이페이") under 타 ta, while the conflicting People's Republic of China (commonly known as China) entered as "중화인민공화국" under 중.

Among the nations with Korean names starting with 이 i, several reorderings occurred because of the hostile relationship between the countries. Hangul alphabetic order would have dictated . Iran was moved three spaces later in the parade while Israel was moved five spaces later (an additional two spaces past Iran), changing the parade order into .

160 nations entered the stadium with a combined total of 8,391 athletes. Eight nations made their Olympic debut: Aruba, American Samoa, Brunei, Cook Islands, Maldives, Vanuatu, Saint Vincent and the Grenadines, and South Yemen. North Korea and its ally Cuba boycotted the games for the second consecutive time, while Ethiopia, Albania and the Seychelles did not respond to the invitations sent by the IOC, allegedly in solidarity with North Korea. Madagascar did not participate due to financial considerations, Nicaragua did not participate due to the ongoing civil war, and South Africa was excluded due to its apartheid policies.

Notable flag bearers in the opening ceremony featured the following athletes: seven-time Olympian and Star sailor Hubert Raudaschl (Austria); defending Olympic champions Evelyn Ashford (United States) in the women's 100-metre dash; Jouko Salomaki (Finland) and Vasile Andrei (Romania) in Greco-Roman wrestling; Ernesto Canto (Mexico) in race walking; Agneta Andersson (Sweden) in the women's kayak sprinting; Matija Ljubek in the men's canoe sprinting; and six-time Olympian Reiner Klimke (Federal Republic of Germany), who led the West German team to a gold-medal victory in the equestrian dressage; synchronized swimmers Mikako Kotani (Japan) and Carolyn Waldo (Canada), who eventually topped the podium in both the solo and duet routines; eight-time Olympian and Star sailor Durward Knowles (the Bahamas); eventual gold medalists Ulf Timmermann (German Democratic Republic) in the men's shot put and Aleksandr Karelin (Soviet Union) in the super heavyweight Greco-Roman wrestling; five-time track sprinter and Moscow 1980 champion Pietro Mennea (Italy); long-distance runner Grete Andersen-Waitz (Norway), who bagged a silver medal in the inaugural women's marathon four years earlier; and world-number-three tennis player Gabriela Sabatini (Argentina) in the women's singles.

List
The following is a list of each country's announced flag bearer. The names are given in their official designations by the IOC.

Some differences occurred between the official placard displays and the official announcements:
 A number of designations were abbreviated on the placards, but announced in full.
 The United States delegation was announced as "the United States of America" and appeared on the placard as "U.S.A.".
 The Soviet Union delegation was abbreviated in both the announcements and the placard.
 South Yemen's delegation was announced as "Yemen Democratic Republic", but appeared on the placard as "Dem. Rep. of Yemen".
 Egypt's delegation was announced as the "Arab Republic of Egypt", but appeared on the placard as "Egypt".
 The Central African Republic delegation was announced as "Central African Republic", but appeared on the placard as "Central Africa".
 Côte d'Ivoire's delegation was announced as "Ivory Coast", but appeared on the placard as "Côte d'Ivoire".
 Congo's delegation was announced as "People's Republic of Congo", but appeared on the placard as "Congo".
 Fiji's delegation was announced as "Fiji Islands", but appeared on the placard as "Fiji".

See also
 1984 Summer Olympics national flag bearers
 1992 Summer Olympics national flag bearers

References

 
Lists of Olympic flag bearers